In Greek mythology, Iache (Ancient Greek: Ἰάχη Iakhê means 'cry, shout, shriek') was one of the 3,000 Oceanids, water-nymph daughters of the Titans Oceanus and his sister-spouse Tethys.

Mythology 
Along with her sisters, Iache was one of the companions of Persephone when the daughter of Demeter was abducted by Hades.

Notes

Reference 

 The Homeric Hymns and Homerica with an English Translation by Hugh G. Evelyn-White. Homeric Hymns. Cambridge, MA.,Harvard University Press; London, William Heinemann Ltd. 1914. Online version at the Perseus Digital Library. Greek text available from the same website.

 Oceanids